is a 1997 Japanese film directed by Takashi Ishii. The film stars Riona Hazuki and Reiko Takashima.

See also 
Kuro no tenshi Vol. 2
 

1997 films
Films directed by Takashi Ishii
Films shot in Japan
1990s crime films
Girls with guns films
1990s Japanese films